Tell Me in the Sunlight is a 1965 American romantic drama produced, directed, and co-written by and starring Steve Cochran. It was released in 1967, after Cochran's mysterious death.

Cast
 Steve Cochran as Dave
 Shary Marshall as Julie
 Jay Robinson as Barber
 Dave Bondu as Alex
 Patricia Wolf as Chata
 George Hopkins as Tony
 Rockne Tarkington as Rocky
 Harry Franklin as Dr. Franklin

Production
Jo Heims wrote the script from a Robert Stevens story. The film was going to be shot at Herbert Vendig's production base in Freeport, Grand Bahama in 1962. It was also going to be filmed in Brazil and Argentina. He wound up filming it in the Bahamas but when he came home to Hollywood in June 1963 he declared he needed to reshoot it with a new actress. In October 1964 it was announced Cochran would be making the film with Shary Marshall.

Release
Following Cochran's death, in 1967 his mother turned the film over to Films International Distributing Organization.

References

External links

Tell Me in the Sunlight at TCMDB

1965 films
1965 directorial debut films
1965 romantic drama films
American romantic drama films
Films set in the Bahamas
Films shot in the Bahamas
Films with screenplays by Jo Heims
1960s English-language films
1960s American films
English-language romantic drama films